Better Days is an American sitcom that aired on CBS from October 1 to October 29, 1986.

Summary
Brian McGuire is a California teenager who moves in with his grandfather, Harry in Brooklyn, New York to ease his parents' financial problems. Helping Brian adjust to his new surroundings were Luther Cain and Anthony "The Snake" Johnson, two of his street-smart teammates on the Broxton High School basketball team. Miss Winners was their cynical, no-nonsense English high school teacher. Terrance Dean was their yuppie classmate.

Cancellation
Better Days was the first show of the 1986-1987 television season to be canceled. It lasted only four weeks. People magazine was highly critical of the series during its short run on CBS; in its year-end review, Jeff Jarvis, then the TV critic for the magazine, described it as "a shockingly racist sitcom that looked as if it had been produced by South African TV."

Cast
Raphael Sbarge: Brian McGuire
Chip McAllister: Luther Cain
Guy Killum: Anthony "The Snake" Johnson
Randall Batinkoff: Terrance Dean
Randee Heller: Miss Harriet Winners
Dick O'Neill: Harry Clooney

Episodes

References

1986 American television series debuts
1986 American television series endings
1980s American high school television series
1980s American teen sitcoms
CBS original programming
Television series about teenagers
Television shows set in New York City
Television series by Lorimar Television
Brooklyn in fiction